Christen Christensen  (17 September 1904 in Oslo – 2 June 1969 in Oslo) was a Norwegian pair skater. He represented Oslo Skøiteklub.

His pairs partner was Randi Bakke. They are the 1933 World bronze medalists. They finished fifth at the 1923 World Figure Skating Championships and the 1934 World Figure Skating Championships. They represented Norway at the 1936 Winter Olympics, where they placed 15th.

They were also eight time (1929–1936) Norwegian national champions.

Results
with Randi Bakke

References

Navigation

1904 births
1969 deaths
Norwegian male pair skaters
Olympic figure skaters of Norway
Figure skaters at the 1936 Winter Olympics
Sportspeople from Oslo
World Figure Skating Championships medalists